John fitz Richard (died 11 October 1190)  was an Anglo-Norman soldier, Baron of Halton and hereditary Constable of Chester. Historical records refer to him as "John, Constable of Chester". He died at Acre in the Holy Land.

Origins 
He was the eldest son and heir of Richard fitz Eustace (d. 1163), hereditary Constable of Chester, by his wife Albreda de Lisours (d. 1194), daughter of Robert de Lissours by his wife Albreda de Lacy, daughter and heiress of Robert de Lacy (d.1193), Baron of Pontefract. His younger brother Roger fitz Richard was Lord of Warkworth Castle and another brother, Robert fitz Richard, was the Prior of the Knights Hospitaller in England.

Career
After the death of his father in 1163 John inherited his Barony of Halton and the Office of Constable of Chester, whereupon he became the chief official of Hugh de Kevelioc, 5th Earl of Chester. After the death of Hugh in 1181 he served in the same capacity for his heir Ranulf de Blondeville, 6th Earl of Chester. In 1166 he paid a fee of 1,000 marks to obtain his mother's possessions, including the former de Lacy estates. After 1172 he founded Stanlow Abbey in Cheshire, of the Cistercian order, and a hospital in Castle Donington. Earl Hugh granted him lands in Antrobus, Cheshire and in 1178 confirmed John's donation of Little Stanney to Stanlow Abbey, and a little later he gave the monks the duty to pay in Chester.

During the rebellion against King Henry II in 1173, John was a loyal supporter of the king. In early May 1181, when Hugh de Lacy, Lord of Meath lost the King's favour and was removed from office as Justiciar of Ireland, John was sent to Ireland together with Richard Peche, Bishop of Coventry to take control of Dublin. Nevertheless, they supported Hugh before he left Ireland in the construction of many castles in Leinster. The following winter John and Bishop Peche were recalled to England, while Hugh de Lacy returned to Ireland. On 3 September 1189, John took part in the coronation of King Richard I. In March 1190, he left England to participate in the Third Crusade, during which he died in the Holy Land during the Siege of Acre.

Marriage and issue
He married Alice of Essex, a daughter of Robert of Essex by his wife Alice, by whom he had several children, including:
Roger de Lacy (1170–1211), eldest son and heir, known in his youth as "Roger fitz John". In 1194 his paternal grandmother Aubrey/Albreda de Lissours surrendered to him the feudal barony of Pontefract in Yorkshire, which she had inherited from her mother Aubrey/Albreda de Lacy. Thereupon he adopted the surname "de Lacy". He married Maud de Clere and had issue.
Richard of Chester, buried in Norton Priory
Geoffrey fitz John
Robert of Flamborough
Eustace of Chester, possibly illegitimate.

Citations

References 
 
 Dugdale, William. The Baronage of England, Volume 1. G. Olms, 1675. 

12th-century English military personnel
12th-century Normans
1190 deaths
Christians of the Third Crusade
Norman warriors
Anglo-Normans
English military personnel killed in action
Year of birth unknown
Lords Lieutenant of Ireland
Barons of Halton